Krasnokamianka (also known as Kiziltash or Kyzyltash, the same word in Turkic dialects; literally, red stone) is a resort and urban-type settlement in Yalta Municipality in the Autonomous Republic of Crimea, a territory recognized by a majority of countries as part of Ukraine and incorporated by Russia as the Republic of Crimea. Population:

Geography
Krasnokamianka is a former Crimean Tatar village, now a part of Greater Yalta, on the northern coast of the Black Sea.

It is near the headquarters of the Eurasian Scout Region, the divisional office of the World Scout Bureau of the World Organization of the Scout Movement in Gurzuf.

References

Urban-type settlements in Crimea
Populated coastal places in Ukraine
Seaside resorts in Ukraine
Seaside resorts in Russia
Yalta Municipality